Maserati 150S is a racing car made by Maserati of Italy alongside the Maserati 200S, to take over for the aging Maserati A6GCS racing variants. Twenty-seven examples were built, and one additional street-going car, called the Maserati 150 GT.

The project Tipo 53 was designed by Vittorio Bellentani in 1953 and utilized the 4CF2 1484.1 cc engine, fitted with twin Weber 45 DCO3 carburetors and producing  at 7500 rpm. The engine was developed from Alberto Massimino's earlier two-liter version, created to offer a simpler design suitable for private competitors in Formula 2 racing. The 1.5-liter version underwent initial testing in a racing boat belonging to Liborio Guidotti in 1954–1955. Maserati unveiled the 150S at the April 1955 Turin Motor Show; the final example was completed in January 1957.

Development
The first series had a Maserati 300S-inspired body developed by Celestino Fiandri who also assembled the first few chassis; Gilco soon took over this aspect. A less rounded design by Medardo Fantuzzi followed during 1956. Other changes for the second series included a swap from a four-speed transmission with Porsche patent synchromesh to a five-speed unit made by ZF. Eight 1955s were built; it is not certain whether all of them were fitted with the four-speed gearbox. The tubular frame chassis was similar to that of the A6GCS, but with the important distinction of having a de Dion rear axle with transverse leaf springs rather than the A6's live rear end.

The 1957 Maserati 150 GT was a spider built on a Maserati A6GCS chassis intended for street use, bodied by Medardo Fantuzzi and sporting a 150S engine with a lowered compression ratio.

Massimino, the spearhead of Maserati's four-cylinder program, left for Stanguellini in late 1952 and was replaced at Maserati by Gioacchino Colombo. Colombo, as well as Giulio Alfieri who joined Maserati in September 1953, preferred the six-cylinder design and the 150S/200S family was never developed to its full potential. During 1956, Maserati accordingly stopped developing the 150S, although this engine (as well as the larger variants) found new life in later years, being used to power mid-engined, British Formula Two and Formula One chassis into the early 1960s.

Tipo 6
The engine's second life began in 1956 with chassis number 1666, which was delivered to Brian Naylor in the United Kingdom. Naylor found the car, designed for long-distance racing on the continent, too heavy for the short British circuits against the new, rear-engined British designs. He installed the 150S engine in a crashed Lotus Eleven, which proved highly successful with 27 victories and a class win that season. An additional 150S engine was specifically built for Stuart Young to be installed in a Lotus Eleven in 1957, and a few F2 Cooper-Maserati T51s were similarly equipped. When Formula One changed to 1.5 liters maximum displacement for 1961, Maserati restarted production of the 150S engine as the "Maserati Tipo 6 1500".

10 such Tipo 6 engines were built for smaller teams like Scuderia Centro Sud, Ecurie Nationale Belge, JBW (Brian Naylor's own team), and Serenissima. The best result achived by the Tipo 6 engine was at the 1961 Monaco Grand Prix, the first race entered, where Maurice Trintignant took seventh place for Serenissima in a Cooper T51. The last race entered was at the 1963 South African Grand Prix, where privateer Trevor Blokdyk reached the finishing line in 12th place in a similar car.

Competition
Most of the cars built were sold to customers who competed as privateers. The best result for the 150S came when Jean Behra won the half-sized 1000km Nürburgring in 1955. Alejandro de Tomaso finished fourth overall at the 1956 1000 km Buenos Aires, behind two Maserati 300S and a Ferrari 857 Monza, all with factory backing. The engine also had a successful afterlife when fitted to various Lotus and Cooper chassis, as noted in the section on the Tipo 6.

Literature
Karl Ludvigsen, Maserati 150S

References

150S
Sports racing cars